Snakes and Ladders is the fourth album by Gerry Rafferty. It was released in 1980, following the success of his previous two albums, City to City and Night Owl. The album charted at No. 15 in the UK but only reached No. 61 in the US, while singles "Bring It All Home" was #54 in UK and "The Royal Mile" #67 UK and #54 at US Billboard's Hot 100. The album was released on CD in 1998 [EMI 7 46609-2] but deleted soon after that, and it got reissued on CD in August 2012 as a 2-CD set with "Sleepwalking." Some of the songs are available on compilation albums. Four of the songs, "The Garden of England", "I was a Boy Scout", "Welcome to Hollywood" and "Bring it all Home" were recorded at Beatles producer George Martin's AIR studio in Montserrat. All the songs were original Rafferty compositions, though one – "Johnny's Song" – was a remake of a song which had been previously released by his former band Stealers Wheel, and another – "Didn't I" – was a remake of a song from Rafferty's 1971 album Can I Have My Money Back?.

Track listing
All tracks composed by Gerry Rafferty
"The Royal Mile" – 3:48
"I Was a Boy Scout" – 4:15
"Welcome to Hollywood" – 5:17
"Wastin' Away" – 3:29
"Look at the Moon" – 2:18
"Bring It All Home" – 4:40
"The Garden of England" – 4:08
"Johnny's Song" – 3:25
"Didn't I" – 4:14
"Syncopatin Sandy" – 4:24
"Café Le Cabotin" – 4:51
"Don't Close the Door" – 3:45

Charts
Album

Certifications

Personnel 
 Gerry Rafferty – vocals, acoustic guitar (1, 2, 3, 9, 11), backing vocals (9)
 Ian Lynn – keyboards (1, 5, 8, 10, 11), synthesizers (3, 7)
 Billy Livsey – acoustic piano (2, 3, 6), clavinet (3), mystery voice (3), Polymoog (6), keyboards (7), pianica (11)
 Pete Wingfield – organ (2, 6, 12), acoustic piano (12)
 Bryn Haworth – slide guitar (2, 12)
 Jerry Donahue – lead guitar (3), guitar swells (3), guitars (4, 6, 8, 9, 11)
 Richard Brunton – guitar (3), guitars (6, 7, 11), electric guitars (12)
 Mo Foster – bass (1, 2, 3, 6, 7, 11, 12)
 Pete Zorn – bass (4, 8, 9, 10)
 Liam Genockey – drums (1-4, 6–12)
 Frank Ricotti – percussion (1, 3, 4, 8, 11), congas (2), tambourine (9), woodblocks (10)
 Richard Harvey – penny whistle (1)
 Raphael Ravenscroft – saxophone (3, 6)
 Chris Mercer – brass arrangements (2)
 Wil Malone – string arrangements (5, 7, 10), clarinet arrangements (10)
 Gavyn Wright – string leader (5, 7, 10)
 Betsy Cook – backing vocals (9)
 The Baron de Bon Bon – intro (11)

Production 
 Gerry Rafferty – producer 
 Hugh Murphy – producer 
 Barry Hammond – recording (1, 4, 5, 8–12), overdubbing (2, 3, 6, 7)
 Stephen Lipson – recording (2, 3, 6, 7)
 John Patrick Byrne – cover
 Michael Gray – inner sleeve photography, inner sleeve concept, management

References

External links

Gerry Rafferty albums
1980 albums
United Artists Records albums
Albums recorded at AIR Studios